Dagblaðið was an Icelandic newspaper founded in 1975 by former employees of Vísir with Jónas Kristjánsson as its first editor. It marked a breakthrough in Icelandic newspaper publication as it was the first major newspaper that was independent of political parties. Its first edition was published on 8 September the same year.

On 26 November 1981, Dagblaðið and Vísir merged to form Dagblaðið Vísir.

References

External links
Published Issues at the National and University Library of Iceland

1975 establishments in Iceland
Newspapers established in 1975
Daily newspapers published in Iceland
Defunct newspapers published in Iceland
Mass media in Reykjavík
Publications disestablished in 1981
1981 disestablishments in Iceland